Ptyas mucosa, commonly known as the oriental ratsnake, Indian rat snake, darash or dhaman, is a common non-venomous species of colubrid snake found in parts of South and Southeast Asia. Dhamans are large snakes. Typical mature total length is around  though some exceed . Despite their large size, oriental ratsnakes are usually quite slender with even a specimen of  commonly measuring  only around in diameter. Their color varies from pale browns in dry regions to nearly black in moist forest areas. Rat snakes are diurnal, semi-arboreal, non-venomous, and fast-moving. Rat snakes eat a variety of prey and are frequently found in urban areas where rodents thrive.

Geographic range
Found in Afghanistan, Andaman and Nicobar Islands, Bangladesh, Myanmar, Cambodia, China (Zhejiang, Hubei, Jiangxi, Fujian, Guangdong, Hainan, Guangxi, Yunnan, Tibet, Hong Kong), Taiwan, India, Sri Lanka, Indonesia (Sumatra, Java, Bali), Iran, Laos, West Malaysia, Nepal, Myanmar, Pakistan (Sindh area), Thailand, Turkmenistan and Vietnam.

Predators
Adult rat snakes have no natural predators, although younger specimens are the natural prey of King cobras that overlap them in their range. Juveniles fear birds of prey, larger reptiles, and mid-sized mammals. They are wary, quick to react, and fast-moving.

Rat snakes and related colubrids are aggressively hunted by humans in some areas of their range for skins and meat. Harvesting and trade regulations exist in China and Indonesia, but these regulations are often ignored.

Description

Description from Boulenger's Fauna of British India: Reptilia and Batrachia volume of 1890:

Snout obtuse, slightly projecting; eye large; rostral a little broader than deep, visible from above; suture between the internasals shorter than that between the prefrontals; frontal as long as its distance from the end of the snout, as long as the parietals or slightly shorter; usually three loreals; one large preocular, with a small subocular below; two postoculars; temporals 2+2; 8 Upper labials, fourth and fifth entering the eye; 5 Lower labials in contact with the anterior chin shields, which are shorter than the posterior; the latter in contact anteriorly. Dorsal scales in 17 rows at midbody, more or less strongly keeled on the posterior part of the body. Ventrals 190–208; anal divided; subcaudals 95–135, divided. Brown above, frequently with more or less distinct black crossbands on the posterior part of the body and on the tail; young usually with light crossbands on the front half of the body. Lower surface yellowish; the posterior ventral and the caudal shields may be edged with black.

It is the second largest snake in Sri Lanka, after the Indian rock python.

Behavior

Rat snakes, though harmless to humans, are fast-moving, excitable snakes. In captivity, they are territorial and may defend their turf aggressively, attempting to startle or strike at passing objects. Rat snakes are diurnal and semi-arboreal. They inhabit forest floors, wetlands, rice paddies, farmland, and suburban areas where they prey upon small reptiles, amphibians, birds, and mammals. Adults, unusually for a colubrid, prefer to subdue their prey by sitting on it rather than by constricting, using body weight to weaken prey.

Rat snakes mate in late spring and early summer, though in tropical areas reproduction may take place year round. Males establish boundaries of territory using a ritualised test of strength in which they intertwine their bodies. The behaviour is sometime misread by observers as a "mating dance" between opposite-sex individuals. Females produce 6–15 eggs per clutch several weeks after mating.

Adult members of this species emit a growling sound and inflate their necks when threatened. This adaptation may represent mimicry of the king cobra or Indian cobra which overlaps this species in range. The resemblance often backfires in human settlements, though, as the harmless animal may be mistaken for a venomous snake and killed.

Nomenclature
The International Code for Zoological Nomenclature (ICZN) directs that the grammatical gender of any given species name should follow logically from the gender of its associated genus name. As Ptyas is a feminine word form (from πτυάς, a Greek word for a venom-spitting snake), the proper form of the species name is mucosa (a Late Latin word meaning "slimy"). Reference materials older than 2004 often show the masculine form, mucosus, and the CITES list continues to list the species this way.

Gallery

References

Further reading

 David, P., and I. Das. 2004. On the grammar of the gender of Ptyas Fitzinger, 1843 (Serpentes: Colubridae). Hamaddryad 28 (1 & 2): 113–116.
 Günther, A. 1898. Notes on Indian Snakes in Captivity. Ann. Mag. Nat. Hist., Series 7, 1: 30–31. (Zamenis mucosus, p. 30.)
 Jan, G., & F. Sordelli. 1867. Iconographie générale des Ophidiens: Vingt-quatrième livraison. Baillière. Paris. Index + Plates I.–VI. ("Coryphodon Blumenbachi, Merr.", Plate III., Figures 2–4.)
 Lazell, J.D. 1998. Morphology and the status of the snake genus Ptyas. Herpetological Review 29 (3): 134.
 Linnaeus, C. 1858. Systema naturæ per regna tria naturæ, secundum classes, ordines, genera, species, cum characteribus, differentiis, synonymis, locis. Tomus I. Editio Decima, Reformata. L. Salvius. Stockholm. 824 pp. (Coluber mucosus, p. 226.)
 Morris, P.A. 1948. Boy's Book of Snakes: How to Recognize and Understand Them. A volume of the Humanizing Science Series, edited by Jacques Cattell. Ronald Press. New York. viii + 185 pp. ("The Indian Rat Snake", pp. 136–137, 181.)
 Nixon, A.M.A., and S. Bhupathy. 2001. Notes on the occurrence of Dhaman (Ptyas mucosus) in the higher altitudes of Nilgiris, Western Ghats. Cobra (44): 30–31.

External links 
 

Colubrids
Reptiles described in 1758
Reptiles of Afghanistan
Reptiles of Bangladesh
Reptiles of Cambodia
Reptiles of Central Asia
Reptiles of China
Reptiles of India
Reptiles of Indonesia
Reptiles of Iran
Reptiles of Laos
Reptiles of Myanmar
Reptiles of Nepal
Reptiles of Pakistan
Reptiles of Sri Lanka
Reptiles of Taiwan
Reptiles of Thailand
Reptiles of Vietnam
Snakes of Asia
Taxa named by Carl Linnaeus

ceb:Ptyas korros
sv:Ptyas korros